The Rodeo Hall of Fame was established by the National Cowboy & Western Heritage Museum in 1955. Located in Oklahoma City, Oklahoma, U.S., the Hall was created to celebrate the contributions of cowboys and cowgirls from around the world. The hall is a tribute to the most notable rodeo performers, who established the path for today's champions. The hall of fame has the largest rodeo collection in the nation and claims to be the first rodeo hall of fame.

Inductees include competitors from the main rodeo events such as bull riding, bronc riding, barrel racing, steer wrestling, tie-down roping, steer roping, and team roping. Other events may be included.

Members of the Rodeo Hall of Fame
The following are Rodeo Hall of Fame member inductees, followed by their state, birth, death, and year inducted.

See also
 :Category:People of the American Old West
 Hall of Great Western Performers
 Hall of Great Westerners

References

External links
Official WebSite
National Cowboy & Western Heritage Museum

1955 establishments in Oklahoma
American film awards
West
Culture of Oklahoma City
Culture of the Western United States
Cowboy halls of fame
Sports halls of fame
Sports hall of fame inductees
Awards established in 1955
Lists of sports awards
National Cowboy & Western Heritage Museum